Reinhard Dietrich (14 February 1932 – 7 March 2015) was a German sculptor.

Life
Reinhard Dietrich was born in Breslau less than a year before the increasingly challenged "Weimar" regime was replaced by the Nazi government. By the time he was 13 frontiers had moved and Breslau was rapidly becoming Wrocław, ethnically and politically part of Poland. Between 1946 and 1950 Dietrich lived in Wittenberg within the Soviet occupation zone of Germany, where he undertook an apprenticeship in the art of wood carving. This was followed by a period of study at the Wood carving Academy in Empfertshausen (1950–1952), and two or three years of further study at the College of Applied Arts at Leipzig (1952–1954). After this he moved on to the Dresden Academy of Fine Arts where he was taught by Hans Steger and Walter Arnold.

Between 1958 and 1964 Dietrich worked as a freelance artist based in Dresden, teaming up at one point in a shared workshop with Wieland Förster.   In 1964 he relocated to the north coast, living at Kneese (Bad Sülze), a short distance outside Rostock on its eastern side.   He stayed in the Rostock area for nearly four decades, and it was here that he had his most productive years.   Several of his works can be found on public display in and around Rostock.  Some of the work from his Rostock years was produced in collaboration with Jo Jastram (1928–2011).

With his wife, Magda, he returned to live in Dresden in 2003, and it was here that he died in 2015.

Output (not a complete list) 
 1965 "Mutter und Kind", Universitätsklinikum Dresden
 1966 "Möwenflug", Klinkerbild in der Langen Straße Rostock
 1970 "Sieben stolze Schwestern küsst das eine Meer", Fountain in Rostock (relocated 2008)
 1971 "Möwenflug", Bronzeplastik in Warnemünde vor dem Hotel Neptun
 1976 "Lotsenehrung", Concrete sculpture in Warnemünde by the Light Tower
 1976/77 mehrere Klinkergiebel, Rostock Evershagen
 1977 Relief on the podium of the Gedenkstätte der revolutionären Matrosen (Memorial to the revolutionary sailors) in Rostock
 1979 "Sonnenblumen", Hausgiebelgestaltung in Lichtenhagen (Rostock)
 1979 "Mecklenburgische Bäuerin", Berlin-Alt-Hohenschönhausen
 1980 "Brunnen der Lebensfreude" auf dem Universitätsplatz (Rostock) gemeinsam mit dem Bildhauer Jo Jastram
 1985 "Frau am Fenster", Terrakottafigur am Fünfgiebelhaus in Rostock
 1985 Relief "Bodenreform", Dorf Mecklenburg
 1986 Ehrenmal für die Opfer des Faschismus in Bad Doberan in der Nähe des Münsters
 1988 Satirische Plastik über das Auto, Kopenhagen
 1994 Marktbrunnen, Marlow
 1994 Sandsteinstele Salzstadt, Bad Sülze

References

20th-century German sculptors
20th-century German male artists
German male sculptors
21st-century German sculptors
21st-century German male artists
Artists from Wrocław
People from Mecklenburg
Artists from Dresden
Recipients of the National Prize of East Germany
1932 births
2015 deaths